The Central District of Malekan County is in East Azerbaijan province, Iran. At the National Census in 2006, its population was 77,132 in 19,482 households. The following census in 2011 counted 81,949 people in 23,019 households. At the latest census in 2016, the district had 85,938 inhabitants in 26,072 households.

References 

Malekan County

Districts of East Azerbaijan Province

Populated places in East Azerbaijan Province

Populated places in Malekan County